Martin Starger (born May 8, 1932) is an American entertainment entrepreneur. He led ABC Entertainment (a wing of the American Broadcasting Company) during its boom period in the 1970s, pioneering the creation of television shows such as ABC Movie of the Week, Marcus Welby, M.D. and Happy Days.  He also pushed the limits of television broadcast presiding over pioneering miniseries and specials such as Roots and Rich Man, Poor Man.  

He made his way into films as the executive producer of Robert Altman's 1975 film Nashville before becoming tied to the film production department of Lew Grade's ITC Entertainment starting with Stanley Donen's 1978 film Movie Movie.  Working with Grade, Starger became the president of Associated Film Distribution, the distributor of ITC's films which tied him to the production of films both successful (Autumn Sonata, The Muppet Movie, On Golden Pond, Sophie's Choice) as well as the bombs that destroyed the company (Raise the Titanic!, The Legend of the Lone Ranger, Saturn 3).  After the fall of AFD, Starger continued to produce films such as Peter Bogdanovich's 1985 film Mask.

External links
 
 Profile of Martin Starger from a booklet for Raise the Titanic!

 

1932 births
American Broadcasting Company executives
American film producers
American people of German descent
American television executives
Living people
Place of birth missing (living people)
Presidents of American Broadcasting Company Entertainment